
Gmina Osieck is a rural gmina (administrative district) in Otwock County, Masovian Voivodeship, in east-central Poland.

The gmina contains part of the protected area called Masovian Landscape Park.

Villages
Gmina Osieck contains the villages and settlements of Augustówka, Czarnowiec, Górki, Grabianka, Kolonia Osieck, Kolonia Pogorzel, Lipiny, Natolin, Nowe Kościeliska, Osieck, Pogorzel, Rudnik, Sobieńki, Stare Kościeliska and Wójtowizna.

Neighbouring gminas
Gmina Osieck is bordered by the gminas of Celestynów, Garwolin, Kołbiel, Pilawa and Sobienie-Jeziory.

References
Polish official population figures 2006

Osieck
Otwock County